The Free Life Bridge is a historic stone arch bridge over the Cao Port in Zhujiajiao, Qingpu District, Shanghai.

History
The bridge was originally built in 1571 with funds collected by monk Xingchao from Cimen Temple. In the Ming and Qing dynasties (1368–1911), local monks would hold a ceremony on the bridge, releasing live fish into the port. It had been on the list of "The Ten Views of Zhujiajiao". It was rebuilt in 1812, in the ruling of Jiaqing Emperor (1796–1820) of the Qing dynasty (1644–1911).

On November 17, 1987, it has been designated as a municipal level cultural heritage by the Shanghai Municipal Government.

Architecture
It is of five-arch type. The bridge has a gentle slope as it adopts ultra-thin piers and arches with modest size changes, spanning naturally across the river, which looks majestic but not bulky. The stone carvings on the bridge are exquisite.

Film Culture and Manga
 Mission: Impossible III
 Mobile Suit Gundam SEED in Shanghai. Lacus Clyne standing Free life Bridge waiting to meet X 108 Freedom Gundam Piloted by: Kira Yamato.

See also
 List of bridges in China

References

Bibliography
 

Bridges in Shanghai
Arch bridges in China
Bridges completed in 1812
Qing dynasty architecture
Buildings and structures completed in 1812
1812 establishments in China